Colvin Park is an unincorporated community in DeKalb County, Illinois, United States, located  north-northwest of Kingston.

References

Unincorporated communities in DeKalb County, Illinois
Unincorporated communities in Illinois